The 1983 World Table Tennis Championships women's doubles was the 36th edition of the women's doubles championship.
Shen Jianping and Dai Lili defeated Geng Lijuan and Huang Junqun in the final by three sets to two.

Results

See also
List of World Table Tennis Championships medalists

References

-
1983 in women's table tennis